Imarti is a sweet from India. It is made by deep-frying vigna mungo flour batter in a circular flower shape, then soaking in sugar syrup. Alternative names include Amitti, Amriti, Emarti, Omritti, Jahangir and Jhangiri/Jaangiri. This dish is not to be confused with jalebi which is thinner and sweeter than Imarti. Amitti is a popular Iftar item in Bangladesh. It is a specialty of Sylheti desserts for Iftari that is made without any food color.Jaunpur district of Uttar Pradesh is also known for its special Imarti.

Ingredients
Amriti or Jangri is made from varieties of black gram flour, also colloquially called jangiri parappu (lentils) or jangiri black gram in, Tamilnadu, Andhra Pradesh, Telangana and other parts of the Indian subcontinent. Saffron is added for colour.

Preparation

Black gram is soaked in water a for few hours, and stone-ground into a fine batter. The batter is poured into ghee, though other oils are sometimes used. Like funnel cakes, the batter is poured into geometric patterns, although amriti are generally smaller than funnel cakes. There is often a small ring in the middle.

Before frying the batter, sugar syrup is prepared and is flavored with edible camphor, cloves, cardamom, kewra and saffron. The fried material is then dipped in sugar syrup until it expands in size and soaks up a significant amount of the syrup. In Northern India, imartis are drained, so tend to be drier than jalebis. The pieces can be served hot, at room temperature, or refrigerated.

Serving
In India, this sweet is served during the meal and also popular at weddings and festivals. In particular, Jaunpur in Uttar Pradesh is famous for its imarti. It is also used with dahi.

See also
List of Indian sweets and desserts
List of fried dough foods
 List of doughnut varieties

References

External links

Imarti is also popularly known as "Jangri" in south India, same thing but different names

Indian desserts
Pakistani desserts
Doughnuts
Rajasthani desserts
Fritters